Wait for Me may refer to:

Albums 
 Wait for Me (Moby album), 2009
 Wait for Me (The Pigeon Detectives album), 2007
 Wait for Me (Susan Tedeschi album), 2002
 Wait for Me: The Best from Rebecca St. James, a 2003 album

Songs
 "Wait for Me" (Hall & Oates song), 1979
 "Wait for Me" (Kings of Leon song), 2013
 "Wait for Me" (Rebecca St. James song), 2000
 "Wait for Me"/"Song of Love", a 2003 single by Rebecca St. James
 "Wait for Me" (Rise Against song), 2012
 "Wait for Me" (Theory of a Deadman song), from their 2008 release Scars & Souvenirs
 "Wait for Me", a song from the official Blade Runner soundtrack

Other 
 Wait for Me (poem), a 1941 poem by Konstantin Simonov
 Wait for Me: Rediscovering the Joy of Purity in Romance, a 2002 book by Rebecca St. James
 Wait for Me!... Memoirs of the Youngest Mitford Sister, a 2010 biography of Deborah Cavendish
 Wait for Me (aka Espérame), a 1933 musical drama by director Louis J. Gasnier
 Wait for Me (film), a 1943 Soviet war drama
 Wait for Me (TV program), a Russian telecast